Nic Nicosia (born 1951) is an American artist using photography, sculpture, and drawing in his practice. He received a BS in radio-television-film, with a concentration in motion pictures, from the University of North Texas in 1974. He was awarded a Louis Comfort Tiffany Foundation grant in 1984 and a Guggenheim Fellowship in 2010. Nicosia was born in Dallas, Texas. He lived in Santa Fe, New Mexico from 2004-2015. Nicosia currently lives and works in Dallas, Texas.

Nicosia is considered a pioneer in the staged photographic movement that came into prominence in the early 1980s. Real Pictures #11 is an example of his staged pictures.  It was taken shortly after moving into a new suburban Dallas neighborhood, and uses three children who lived on his street as models.

Public collections
The Dallas Museum of Art, the High Museum of Art (Atlanta), the Honolulu Museum of Art, the Los Angeles County Museum of Art, the Museum of Contemporary Art, Chicago, the Museum of Fine Arts, Houston, the Museum of Modern Art (New York City), the San Francisco Museum of Modern Art, the Solomon R. Guggenheim Museum (New York City), the Walker Art Center (Minneapolis), and the Whitney Museum of American Art (New York City) are among the public collections holding work by Nicosia

References
 Burns, Victoria Espy, Vivid, intense images by American photographers: Sarah Charlesworth, Lynne Cohen, Jeanne Dunning, Barbara Ess, Carl Goldhagen, Nan Goldin, Rodney Alan Greenblat, Annette Lemieux, Frank Majore, Nic Nicosia, Andres Serrano, Cindy Sherman, Laurie Simmons, Lorna Simpson, Sandy Skoglund, Starn Twins, Carrie Mae Weems, Milano, F. Motta editore, 1993 
 Freudenheim, Susan, Nic Nicosia: Real Pictures, New York, Facchetti Gallery, 1988 
 Friis-Hansen, Dana, Lynn M. Herbert and Dave Hickey, Nic Nicosia, Real Pictures 1979-1999, Houston, Contemporary Arts Museum, 1999.
 Nicosia, Nic and Michelle White, Nic Nicosia, University of Texas Press, 2002 
 Randall, Teri Thomson, Nic Nicosia, Salamanca, Spain, Centro de Arte de Salamanca, 2003

Footnotes

External links
 
 Nic Nicosia on AskArt.com

1951 births
American photographers
Jesuit College Preparatory School of Dallas alumni
Living people